United Arab Emirates competed at the 2014 Summer Youth Olympics, in Nanjing, China from 16 August to 28 August 2014.

Athletics

United Arab Emirates qualified one athlete.

Qualification Legend: Q=Final A (medal); qB=Final B (non-medal); qC=Final C (non-medal); qD=Final D (non-medal); qE=Final E (non-medal)

Girls
Field events

Sailing

United Arab Emirates qualified one boat based on its performance at the Byte CII Asian Continental Qualifiers.

Shooting

United Arab Emirates was given a quota to compete by the tripartite committee.

Individual

Team

Swimming

United Arab Emirates qualified one swimmer.

Boys

References

2014 in Emirati sport
Nations at the 2014 Summer Youth Olympics
United Arab Emirates at the Youth Olympics